Michel Fernando Costa (March 11, 1981 – October 8, 2017), known as Michel, was a Brazilian footballer who played in the Gambrinus liga for SK Slavia Prague and 1. FK Příbram.

Michel has played in the Campeonato Brasileiro for CR Vasco da Gama. He scored a goal in Grêmio Barueri's 2006 Campeonato Paulista Série A2 title-clinching 4–1 victory over Sertãozinho.

References

External links

1981 births
2017 deaths
Brazilian footballers
CR Vasco da Gama players
Grêmio Barueri Futebol players
Czech First League players
SK Slavia Prague players
FK Baník Sokolov players
1. FK Příbram players
Association football midfielders
Footballers from São Paulo (state)